Carumbium can be one of these two plant genera:

Carumbium Kurz, which is a synonym of Sapium.
Carumbium Reinw., which is a synonym of Homalanthus.